Marc Leepson (born June 20, 1945, in Newark, New Jersey) is an American journalist, historian, and author.

Education
Leepson was educated at Hillside High School in Hillside, New Jersey (Class of 1963) and George Washington University where he received his Bachelor of Arts degree in history in 1967 and his Master of Arts degree in European History in 1971.

Military service
Almost immediately after graduating from college, Leepson's draft classification was changed by his local draft board and he was drafted into the United States Army in 1967. Chosen to be trained as a clerk, he served for two years, including a year (December 1967-December 1968) in the Vietnam War with the 527th Personnel Service Company in Qui Nhơn. He received his honorable discharge in 1969.

Career
Leepson was a staff writer at Congressional Quarterly in Washington, D.C. from 1976 to 1986. He has been a full-time freelance writer since 1986. He is Senior Writer, Arts Editor and columnist for The VVA Veteran, the magazine published by Vietnam Veterans of America, since 1986.

His work has appeared in many magazines and newspapers, including The Washington Post, The New York Times, The New York Times Book Review, Chicago Tribune, The Baltimore Sun, and Smithsonian, Preservation, and Military History magazines. He has been interviewed many times on radio and television, including on The Today Show, CBS This Morning Saturday, CNN, MSNBC, Fox News, The History Channel, The Discovery Channel, PBS-TV's History Detectives, All Things Considered, Talk of the Nation, Studio 360, NPR's Here and Now, To The Point, Morning Edition, The Diane Rehm Show, "Imus in the Morning," the BBC Newshour, Russian Channel 1 TV (RTV), Irish Radio, and CBC (Canada).

He is a contributor to The Encyclopædia Britannica, and has written entries for the Encyclopedia Americana, the Encyclopedia Americana Yearbook, the Oxford Encyclopedia of American Political and Legal History, and the Dictionary of Virginia Biography.

Since the early 1990s, he has been active in many non-profit groups. That includes board memberships on the Middleburg (Virginia) Library Advisory Board (President and Vice President), the Loudoun County (Virginia) Library Board of Trustees, the Library of Virginia Foundation (Treasurer), the Virginia State Library Board, the Friends of Thomas Balch Library, the YMCA of Loudoun County (Virginia), the Goose Creek Association (Secretary), and the Virginia Piedmont Heritage Area Association (Secretary, Vice President, President). He taught U.S. history at Lord Fairfax Community College (now known as Laurel Ridge Community College) in Warrenton, Virginia from 2008 to 2015, and was Scholar in Residence at Mikveh Israel Synagogue in Savannah, Georgia, in May 2017.

A member of The Authors Guild, he was elected to the Board of Directors of the Biographers International Organization (BIO) in 2013. He was named the organization's Treasurer in 2014.

Personal life
Leepson lives in Loudoun County, Virginia. He and his wife, Janna (Murphy) Leepson, have two children, Devin and Cara. He also has a brother, R. Evan Leepson.

Selected bibliography
 Leepson, Marc. Saving Monticello: One Family's Epic Quest To Rescue The House That Jefferson Built. New York: Free Press, 2001.  
 Leepson, Marc.  Flag: An American Biography. New York: Thomas Dunne Books/St. Martin's Press, 2005.   
 Leepson, Marc. Desperate Engagement: How A Little-Know Civil War Battle Saved Washington, D.C., And Changed American History. New York: Thomas Dunne Books/St. Martin's Press, 2007.  
 Leepson, Marc. Lafayette: Lessons In Leadership From The Idealist General. New York: Palgrave Macmillan, 2011.  
 Leepson, Marc. What So Proudly We Hailed: Francis Scott Key, A Life. Palgrave Macmillan, 2014. <
 Leepson, Marc, editor. Webster's New World Dictionary of the Vietnam War. 
 Leepson, Marc. Ballad of the Green Beret: The Life and Wars of Staff Sergeant Barry Sadler from the Vietnam War and Pop Stardom to Murder and an Unsolved, Violent Death. Stackpole Books, 2017.

References

External links
Marc Leepson’s official website

National Archives of the United States, June 26, 2014, talk on Francis Scott Key.
Talk on Desperate Engagement, Podcast and video at Pritzker Military Museum & Library, March 8, 2008

Flag Day 2005 interview, NPR's All Things Considered
"New Book Traces History of American Flag", The Beardsley Report, on Voice of America, July 4, 2005
"Capture the Flag", NPR's On the Media, June 30, 2006
Live Chat on Saving Monticello transcript, The Washington Post Magazine, November 19, 2001

1945 births
Living people
Columbian College of Arts and Sciences alumni
21st-century American historians
21st-century American male writers
American male journalists
Hillside High School (New Jersey) alumni
People from Hillside, New Jersey
Writers from Newark, New Jersey
People from Middleburg, Virginia
United States Army personnel of the Vietnam War
Journalists from Virginia
United States Army soldiers
Historians from Virginia
Historians from New Jersey
American male non-fiction writers